The province of Punjab, the most populous province of Pakistan and the second-largest province by area, is divided into 42 districts and 11 divisions. Below, you will find an overview of the recent history of districts in Punjab, a map showing each district, the divisions of Punjab and their districts, and a list showing each district's name, the division the district belongs to, the district's area, the location of the district's headquarters, the district's population and population density (in 2017), the average annual population growth rate of each district (between 1998 and 2017), and a map showing each district's location.

History

Colonial Times

1868 - 1901

Districts and Divisions were both introduced in Punjab as administrative units by the British when Punjab became a part of British India, and ever since then, they have formed an integral part in the civil administration of the Punjab (this region today also covers parts of Khyber Pakhtunkhwa, the entire Islamabad Capital Territory, and parts of the Indian States of Chandigarh, Delhi, Haryana, Himachal Pradesh, and Punjab). At the time of Punjab's second census, which took place in 1868, the Punjab was divided into 32 districts, under 10 divisions. The administrative setup of the region was as follows (districts and divisions which do not exist anymore are and are in Pakistani Punjab are in red writing, districts and divisions which were (at least mostly) given to India during the Partition of India are in orange writing, districts and divisions which are (at least mostly) currently in Pakistan's Khyber Pakhtunkhwa province are in green writing, and districts and divisions which have been renamed and are in Pakistani Punjab are in blue writing):

Ambalah Division
Ambalah District
Ludhiana District
Simla District
Amritsar Division
Amritsar District
Gurdaspur District
Sialkot District
Delhi Division
Delhi District
Gurgaon District
Karnal District
Derajat Division
Bannu District
Dera Ghazi Khan District
Dera Ismail Khan District
Hissar Division
Hissar District
Rohtak District
Sirsah District
Jalandhar Division
Hoshiarpur District
Jalandhar District
Kangra District
Lahore Division
Firozpur District
Gujranwala District
Gujrat District
Lahore District
Multan
Jhang District
Montgomery District
Multan District
Muzaffargarh District
Peshawar Division
Hazara District
Kohat District
Peshawar District
Rawalpindi Division
Jhelam District
Rawalpindi District
Shahpur District

The exact same setup was in use at the time of the 1881 Census of Punjab as well.

By the 1901 census, the 10 revenue divisions that had been in place since 1868 had also been reorganized into only 5 larger divisions: Delhi, Jalandhar, Lahore, Multan, and Rawalpindi, and Sirsah District had been absorbed into Hissar District.

1901 - 1911 

Between 1901 and 1911, many changes occurred to Punjab's administrative map. On 25 October 1901, after the 1901 census was taken, the Punjab province was divided into two separate entities: Punjab and the North-West Frontier Province. The North-West Frontier Province consisted of the three districts of Hazara, Kohat, and Peshawar, the Bannu and Marwat Tehsils of Bannu District (which then became Bannu District), and the Dera Ismail Khan, Kulachi, and Tank Tehsils of Dera Ismail Khan District (which then became Dera Ismail Khan District). The tehsils of Dera Ismail Khan and Bannu Districts which were not placed into the North-West Frontier Province became Mianwali District, placed in Multan. In 1904, Attock District was created out of parts of Rawalpindi District and Jhelum District, and Lyallpur District was created out of parts of Gujranwala, Jhang, and Montgomery Districts. In 1909, Montgomery District transferred from Lahore Division to Multan, and Mianwali District transferred from Multan to Rawalpindi Division. This all meant that at the time of Punjab's 1911 Census, Punjab had 29 districts split among 5 divisions. The administrative setup of the region was as follows (districts and divisions which do not exist anymore are and are in Pakistani Punjab are in red writing, districts and divisions which were (at least mostly) given to India during the Partition of India are in orange writing, and districts and divisions which have been renamed and are in Pakistani Punjab are in blue writing):

Delhi Division
Ambala District
Delhi District
Gurgaon District
Hissar District
Karnal District
Rohtak District
Simla District
Jalandhar Division
Ferozpur District
Hoshiarpur District
Jalandhar District
Kangra District
Ludhiana District
Lahore Division
Amritsar District
Gujranwala District
Gurdaspur District
Lahore District
Gujrat District
Sialkot District
Multan Division
Dera Ghazi Khan District
Jhang District
Lyallpur District
Montgomery District
Multan District
Muzaffargarh District
Rawalpindi Division
Attock District
Jhelum District
Mianwali District
Rawalpindi District
Shahpur District

1911 - 1947 

In late 1911, the imperial capital of British India was moved from Calcutta (today Kolkata) to Delhi. The district was reorganized as its own province that year, decreasing the number of districts in Punjab to 28. After the creation of Delhi Province, Delhi Division went by the name "Ambala Division". In 1919, Sheikhupura District was created from parts of Gujranwala and Lahore Districts and placed in Lahore Division. This meant that the number of districts and divisions in the province was the same in 1921 as it was in 1911, except Ambala Division was one district smaller and Lahore Division was one district larger, although Lahore Division hadn't changed much in area and population. The administrative setup of Punjab was as follows (districts and divisions which do not exist anymore are and are in Pakistani Punjab are in red writing, districts and divisions which were (at least mostly) given to India during the Partition of India are in orange writing, and districts and divisions which have been renamed and are in Pakistani Punjab are in blue writing):

Ambala Division
Ambala District
Gurgaon District
Hissar District
Karnal District
Rohtak District
Simla District
Jalandhar Division
Ferozpur District
Hoshiarpur District
Jalandhar District
Kangra District
Ludhiana District
Lahore Division
Amritsar District
Gujranwala District
Gurdaspur District
Lahore District
Gujrat District
Sheikhupura District
Sialkot District
Multan Division
Dera Ghazi Khan District
Jhang District
Lyallpur District
Montgomery District
Multan District
Muzaffargarh District
Rawalpindi Division
Attock District
Jhelum District
Mianwali District
Rawalpindi District
Shahpur District

This exact setup existed in Punjab through the 1931 census, 1941 census, and all the way up to the partition of India and the independence of India and Pakistan.

Post-Independence

1947 - 1954 

At the time of the Partition of India, Punjab was split religiously. As of the 1941 census, Punjab had a population that was 53.22% Muslim (mostly concentrated in the Western regions of the province), 29.11% Hindu (mostly concentrated in the Eastern regions of the province), and 14.91% Sikh (mostly concentrated in the center of the province, around Amritsar and Lahore). Because of this divide, Punjab was split into East Punjab, which would have a Hindu/Sikh majority and would be placed in India, and West Punjab, which would have a Muslim majority and would be placed in Pakistan. The line dividing the two was placed by Cyrial Radcliffe, and the line he drew would come to be known as the Radcliffe line.

In the partition, Multan Division and Rawalpindi Division, which were 75.43% and 85.52% Muslim respectively, were entirely given to Pakistan. Each district and each tehsil in both of these divisions had a proportion of Muslims over 50%.

Ambala Division was given to India, being only 28.07% Muslim. Every district in Ambala Division had a non-Muslim majority, and all tehsils but two had non-Muslim majorities (Ferozpur Jhirka and Nuh Tehsils in Gurgaon District had Muslim proportions of 78.79% and 57.88% respectively, but they were very far from all the other Muslim majority districts and tehsils in the Punjab, being next to Delhi).

Jalandhar Division was entirely given to India as well, and each of its districts had a non-Muslim majority. Four Tehsils in this division, though, Ferozpur (55.25% Muslim) and Zira (65.26% Muslim) Tehsils in Ferozpur District, and Jalandhar (51.16% Muslim) and Nakodar (59.41% Muslim) Tehsils in Jalandhar District all had Muslim majorities and bordered Pakistan.

In Lahore Division, Gujranwala (70.45% Muslim), Sheikhupura (63.62% Muslim), and Sialkot (62.18% Muslim) Districts were all entirely given to Pakistan. In these three districts, each tehsil also had a Muslim majority. Amritsar District (46.52% Muslim) was entirely given to India, despite having one tehsil (Ajnala Tehsil at 59.46% Muslim) bordering other Muslim-majority tehsils and districts that was also Muslim-majority. Lahore District and Gurdaspur Districts, both Muslim majority (60.62% Muslim and 51.14% Muslim respectively) were the only two districts in Punjab that were split. In Gurdaspur District, which had four tehsils, three tehsils were majority Muslim (Batala, Gurdaspur, and Shakargarh Tehsils at 55.07%, 52.16%, and 51.32% Muslim respectively) and one tehsil was majority non-Muslim (Pathankot Tehsil at 38.89% Muslim). One tehsil in Gurdaspur District, Shakargarh Tehsil, was given to Pakistan and placed in Sialkot District, and the other three tehsils were all given to India despite forming a contiguous boundary. Lahore District had three tehsils, Chunian, Lahore and Qasur, all of which were Muslim majority (60.85%, 62.12%, and 57.19% Muslim respectively). While Chunian and Lahore Tehsils were entirely given to Pakistan, Qasur Tehsil was divided into two parts, which the larger part going to India. This was under the grounds of "protecting Amritsar city".

In the end, fifteen districts of Punjab went entirely to Pakistan, all of which were Muslim majority; twelve districts of Punjab went entirely to India, all of which were non-Muslim-majority, and the two districts of Gurdaspur and Lahore, both of which were Muslim majority, were split between India and Pakistan. At the tehsil level, though, eight Muslim-majority tehsils which were contiguous with Pakistan were given to India, while not a single non-Muslim-majority tehsil was given to Pakistan. This left sixteen districts in Pakistani Punjab, that were split up into three divisions. No changes to this setup had occurred up to the time of the 1951 census (except for Attock District being renamed Campbellpur District). The administrative setup of Pakistani Punjab in 1951 was as follows (districts and divisions which do not exist anymore are in red writing, and districts and divisions which still exist, but have been renamed are in blue writing):

Lahore Division
Gujrat District
Gujranwala District
Lahore District
Sheikhupura District
Sialkot District
Multan Division
Dera Ghazi Khan District
Jhang District
Lyallpur District
Montgomery District
Multan District
Muzaffargarh District
Rawalpindi Division
Campbellpur District
Jhelum District
Mianwali District
Rawalpindi District
Shahpur District

1955 - 1972 

In 1955, the One Unit policy that consolidated all of West Pakistan into one province began. From 1955 - 1970, the province of West Punjab ceased to exist, never to return. The death of the province brought the rise of divisions as the primary form of organizing Pakistan's districts, instead of provinces. The area covering former West Punjab, though, kept the same districts and divisions through 1961 (and the 1961 census) as it did in 1951.

The One Unit policy ended in 1970 and provinces returned once again, but when West Punjab was reorganized, it was renamed Punjab and the area which earlier housed the Princely State of Bahawalpur (which, during One Unit, was made into a division and split into the three districts of Bahawalnagar, Bahawalpur, and Rahim Yar Khan) was absorbed into the province.

By the time of the 1972 Census of Pakistan, many changes had been made to the administrative map:

In 1960, Shahpur District was abolished, and Sargodha District took its place, covering the area once occupied by Shahpur District. The headquarters of this new district were placed at the city of Sargodha(that was shifted from Shahpur to Sargodha City in 1940);

In 1960, Punjab gained another division with the formation of Sargodha Division. Sargodha Division was composed of Mianwali and Sargodha Districts (both formerly in Rawalpindi Division) and Faisalabad and Jhang Districts (both formerly in Multan Division);

In 1966, Montgomery District was renamed Sahiwal District, at the same time of the city of Sahiwal's renaming;

This all meant that by the time of the 1972 Census, Punjab was divided into five divisions covering nineteen districts. The administrative setup of Punjab province in 1972 was as follows: (districts and divisions which still exist, but have been renamed are in blue writing)

Bahawalpur Division
Bahawalnagar District
Bahawalpur District
Rahim Yar Khan District
Lahore Division
Gujrat District
Gujranwala District
Lahore District
Sheikhupura District
Sialkot District
Multan Division
Dera Ghazi Khan District
Multan District
Muzaffargarh District
Sahiwal District
Rawalpindi Division
Campbellpur District
Jhelum District
Rawalpindi District
Sargodha Division
Jhang District
Lyallpur District
Mianwali District
Sargodha District

1972 - 1981 

New administrative districts kept being carved up and renamed between 1972 and the year of the next census, 1981.

In 1976, the tehsils of Chunian and Qasur were separated from Lahore District to form Qasur District, which was placed in Lahore Division;

In the same year, the tehsils of Vehari and Malisi in Multan District, and a group of four "qanungo circles" in Sahiwal District's Pakpattan Tehsil were reorganized into their own district, called Vehari District. Vehari District was placed in Multan Division;

In 1977, Lyallpur District was renamed Faisalabad District, at the same time of the city of Faisalabad's renaming;

In 1978, Campbellpur District was renamed Attock District, at the same time of the city of Attock's renaming;

by the time of the 1981 Census, Punjab was divided into five divisions covering 21 districts. The administrative setup of Punjab province in 1981 was as follows:

Bahawalpur Division
Bahawalnagar District
Bahawalpur District
Rahim Yar Khan District
Lahore Division
Gujrat District
Gujranwala District
Lahore District
Qasur District
Sheikhupura District
Sialkot District
Multan Division
Dera Ghazi Khan District
Multan District
Muzaffargarh District
Sahiwal District
Vehari District
Rawalpindi Division
Attock District
Jhelum District
Rawalpindi District
Sargodha Division
Jhang District
Faisalabad District
Mianwali District
Sargodha District

1981 - 1998 

This administrative setup did not last long, and by the time of the 1998 Pakistan Census, over a dozen new districts and three new divisions had been created.

Sometime between the censuses of 1981 and 1998, the districts of Gujranwala, Gujrat, and Sialkot were removed from the divisions of Rawalpindi and Lahore and were organized into the newly created Gujranwala Division.

Sometime between the censuses of 1981 and 1998, the districts of Dera Ghazi Khan and Muzaffargarh were removed from Multan Division and were organized into the newly formed Dera Ghazi Khan Division.

Sometime between the censuses of 1981 and 1998, the districts of Faisalabad and Jhang were removed from Sargodha Division and were organized into the newly formed Faisalabad Division.

Sometime between the censuses of 1981 and 1998, Pakpattan District was created out of Sahiwal District's Pakpattan Tehsil. Pakpattan District was kept in Multan Division.

In 1982, Bhakkar District was formed out of Mianwali District's Bhakkar Tehsil. Bhakkar District was kept inside Sargodha Division.

In 1982, Khushab District was formed out of most of Sargodha District's Khushab Tehsil. Khushab District was kept inside Sargodha Division.

In 1982, Layyah District was formed out of Muzaffargarh District's Layyah Tehsil. Layyah District was a part of Dera Ghazi Khan Division.

In 1982, Okara District was formed out of the two tehsils of Depalpur and Okara inside Sahiwal District. Okara District was placed inside Lahore Division by the time of the 1998 census.

In 1982, Rajanpur District was carved out of Dera Ghazi Khan District's two tehsils of Jampur and Rajanpur, as well as some union councils in Dera Ghazi Khan's de-excluded area, which then became the Rajanpur de-excluded area. This district was a part of Dera Ghazi Khan Division.

In 1982, Toba Tek Singh District was formed out of Faisalabad District's Toba Tek Singh Tehsil and a few Union Councils in Jhang District. Toba Tek Singh District was inside Faisalabad Division by the time of the 1998 census.

In 1985, Chakwal District was formed out of most of Attock District's Talagang Tehsil, Jhelum District's Chakwal Tehsil, and a few more union councils inside Jhelum District. Chakwal District was kept in Rawalpindi Division.

In 1985, Khanewal District was created out of two tehsils in Multan District: Kabirwala and Khanewal. Khanewal District was kept inside Multan Division.

In 1991, Lodhran District was formed out of Multan District's Lodhran Tehsil. Lodhran District was kept inside Multan Division.

In 1991, Narowal District was formed out of the two tehsils of Narowal and Shakargarh inside Sialkot District. Narowal District was inside Gujranwala Division by the time of the 1998 census.

In 1993, Hafizabad District was formed out of Gujranwala District's Hafizabad Tehsil. Hafizabad District was inside Gujranwala Division by the time of the 1998 census.

In 1993, Mandi Bahauddin District was formed out of Gujrat District's Phalia Tehsil. Mandi Bahauddin District was inside Gujranwala Division by the time of the 1998 census.

All this meant was that by the time of the 1998 Census of Pakistan, the province of Punjab was administratively divided into 34 districts inside eight divisions. The administrative setup of Punjab was as follows:

Bahawalpur Division
Bahawalnagar District
Bahawalpur District
Rahim Yar Khan District
Dera Ghazi Khan Division
Dera Ghazi Khan District
Layyah District
Muzaffargarh District
Rajanpur District
Faisalabad Division
Faisalabad District
Jhang District
Toba Tek Singh District
Gujranwala Division
Gujranwala District
Gujrat District
Hafizabad District
Mandi Bahauddin District
Narowal District
Sialkot District
Lahore Division
Lahore District
Okara District
Qasur District
Sheikhupura District
Multan Division
Khanewal District
Lodhran District
Multan District
Pakpattan District
Sahiwal District
Vehari District
Rawalpindi Division
Attock District
Chakwal District
Jhelum District
Rawalpindi District
Sargodha Division
Bhakkar District
Khushab District
Mianwali District
Sargodha District

1998 - Present 

In August 2000, all of the divisions throughout Pakistan were abolished, but were reinstated in their exact previous forms eight years later after the elections of 2008, with one exception. Upon restoration, Sahiwal Division was created, being formed out of Okara, Pakpattan, and Sahiwal Districts in Lahore and Multan Divisions.

In July 2005, the tehsils of Nankana Sahib and Safdarabad were separated from Sheikhupura District and became Nankana Sahib District, the province's 35th district. In January 2008, though, the Safdarabad Tehsil was given back to Sheikhupura District. Punjab got its 36th district in February 2009, when the Chiniot Tehsil, which was before a part of Jhang District, was upgraded and given the status of a district. This raised the total number of districts in Punjab to 36.

This meant that by the time of the 2017 Census of Pakistan, the province of Punjab had 36 districts (two more than in 1998) organized into nine divisions. You can find a list of them below:. August 2022 a new division Gujrat Division was created in Punjab  On October 14, 2022 5 new Districts were created in Punjab. Murree created from Rawalpindi, Talagang from Chakwal, Wazirabad from Gujranwala and added in Gujrat Division, Kot Addu from Muzaffargarh, and Taunsa from Dera Ghazi Khan. On December 31, 2022 1 more district was created in Punjab. Jampur from Rajanpur. On January 14, 2023 Punjab government created Mianwali Division. Currently Punjab has 42 Districts.

Bahawalpur Division
Bahawalnagar District
Bahawalpur District
Rahim Yar Khan District
Dera Ghazi Khan Division
Dera Ghazi Khan District
Jampur District 
Kot Addu District
Layyah District
Muzaffargarh District
Rajanpur District
Taunsa District
Faisalabad Division
Chiniot District
Faisalabad District
Jhang District
Toba Tek Singh District
Gujranwala Division
Gujranwala District
Narowal District
Sialkot District
Gujrat Division
Gujrat District
Hafizabad District
Mandi Bahauddin District
Wazirabad District
Lahore Division
Lahore District
Nankana Sahib District
Kasur District
Sheikhupura District
Mianwali Division
Bhakkar District 
Mianwali District 
Talagang District

Multan Division
Khanewal District
Lodhran District
Multan District
Vehari District
Rawalpindi Division
Attock District
Chakwal District
Jhelum District
Murree District
Rawalpindi District
Talagang District
Sahiwal Division
Okara District
Pakpattan District
Sahiwal District
Sargodha Division
Bhakkar District
Khushab District
Mianwali District
Sargodha District

As of 2023, this is still the current administrative setup. You can observe the current setup in the maps and lists below.

Divisions of Punjab, Pakistan 

In Pakistan, the division is the administrative unit which is higher in hierarchy than a district, but lower in hierarchy than a province. There are 11 divisions in Punjab, each of which have anywhere between three and six districts. They are separated by color on the map above, and you can find a list of them below ordered by alphabetical order.

List of Districts 

Below you will find a list of all 42 districts in the province of Punjab, along with the division it belongs to, the area of the district, the population and population density of the district, the average annual population growth rate of each district (between 1998 and 2017), and a map showing its location. The districts are initially listed in alphabetical order, but they can be sorted in different ways by clicking the headers of the table.

See also 
 List of tehsils of Punjab, Pakistan
 Districts of Pakistan
 Districts of Sindh
 Districts of Khyber Pakhtunkhwa
 Districts of Balochistan, Pakistan
 Districts of Azad Kashmir
 Districts of Gilgit-Baltistan
 Divisions of Pakistan

References 

 
Punjab